Camelia, born Lilian Victor Cohen was an Egyptian actress. She was born on December 13, 1919 and died on August 31, 1950.

Biography 
Camelia was born in Alexandriato an Egyptian-Italian Christian Catholic family. She was discovered by Egyptian director Ahmed Salem who cast her in her first film in 1946 at the age of 17.

As a beautiful socialite in the 
high society of Alexandria, she loved partying. Events surrounding her and her high-society relationships frequently appeared in the tabloids. In particular, gossip surrounding her relationships was often associated with that of Farouk of Egypt.

Camelia was killed in the crash of TWA Flight 903 in 1950 when she was 30 years old. The accident added to the fame and mystery surrounding her image. Her wild lifestyle and tragic death are often compared to that of Marilyn Monroe. Conspiracy theories and speculation about espionage, especially in the context of Israel were also widespread in Egypt, but nothing has ever been proven. Despite a short career, she gained a place in the memory of Egyptian and Arab audiences and left a mark in the films that are still shown all over the Arab world. Famed Egyptian director Atef Salem dedicated his film, "Hafeya A'la Gesr El Zahab" (Barefoot on a Golden Bridge) to her.

Selected Films 
 1947: The Red Mask (el Qenaa el ahmar)
 1947: All Song (el Kol yeghany)
 1948: Temptation (Fitnah)
 1948: A woman’s Imagination (Khayal Imra’ah)
 1949: Dazed Souls (Arwah haynnah)
 1949: Such are Women (el Setat Kida)
 1949: El Bahlawan Street (Shaare' el Bahlawan)
 1949: The Penny Owner (Sahbet El malalim)
 1949: Midnight (Nos el layl)
 1949: My Own Child (Walady)
 1949: The Female Murderer (el Qatelah)
 1950: A Woman of fire (Imra'ah men Nar)
 1950: Dad is Groom (Baba ‘aris)
 1950: Full Moon (Qamar arba ‘tachar)
 1950: The Millionaire (el Millionair)
 1950: Mind is a Blessing (el ‘aal zenah)
 1950: Last Lie (Akher kedbah)
 1950: Cairo Road  (El Tariq ela el Qahirah)

References 

1919 births
1950 deaths
Egyptian film actresses
Egyptian Catholics
Egyptian Christians 
Egyptian people of Italian descent
Egyptian television actresses
Victims of aviation accidents or incidents in Egypt
People from Alexandria